Drumsloe, Northern Ireland is a locality and townland in the Barony of Tirkennedy just east of Ballinamallard township in Magheracross.
Drumsloe is 240.77 acres in area.

History
Drumsloe is known as early as 1609AD when it was known as Dromslo, a name that may be from Druim Sluagh meaning ridge of the hosts. The Griffith's Valuation of 1863 indicates a school was located in Drumsloe.
Significant landmarks include drumsloe lough, where illegal distillery on Drumsloe Island was operated for some time in the early 19th century.

Religion
Religion has played a large part in the History of Drumsloe. About 450AD the local parish was said to have been founded by St Patrick and about 550AD  St Columba passed thorough the area. In 1769 John Wesley visited the district bringing Methodism and nearby Coa Chapel was built in 1770. In the early 20th century further religious movements swept the district.

References

Townlands of County Fermanagh